Nicholas Robert Lemoine,  (born December 1957) is a British academic, professor at Queen Mary University of London, director of the Barts Cancer Institute and centre lead, Centre for Molecular Oncology.

Lemoine's main interests are "the genomics and molecular pathology of pancreatic cancer and the development of oncolytic virotherapy".

He was educated at Abingdon School from 1971 until 1976 before studying medicine at St Bartholomew's Hospital Medical College from 1977 until 1983.

Lemoine was appointed Commander of the Order of the British Empire (CBE) in the 2022 New Year Honours for services to clinical research, particularly during Covid-19.

See also
 List of Old Abingdonians

References

1957 births
Living people
English oncologists
English geneticists
People educated at Abingdon School
Academics of Queen Mary University of London
Foreign members of the Chinese Academy of Engineering
Commanders of the Order of the British Empire